= Iraq Campaign =

Iraq Campaign may refer to:

- Iraq War, a war that lasted from 2003 to 2011
- Iraq Campaign Medal
